Four nation bandy tournament in 1954 was a tournament of friendlies played in Moscow, Soviet Union, in February 1954, contested by Finland, Norway, the Soviet Union and Sweden. Sweden won the tournament.

The Soviet Union invited the other three countries after having seen them playing at the Winter Olympics in Oslo in 1952. The tournament can be seen as a form of unofficial pre-World Championships. The four countries used somewhat different rules prior to this tournament, but the rules were adjusted to be the same for the future.

The next year, the four countries formally founded the international bandy governing body, which would arrange the Bandy World Championships from 1957 onwards.

Matches

 24 February 1954:  -  2-1 (0-1), Moscow, Soviet Union
 24 February 1954:  -  4-0 (1-0), Moscow, Soviet Union
 26 February 1954:  -  8-0 (6-0), Moscow, Soviet Union
 26 February 1954:  -  4-4 (3-2), Moscow, Soviet Union
 28 February 1954:  -  2-0, Moscow, Soviet Union
 28 February 1954:  -  2-1 (2-1), Moscow, Soviet Union

Final results

References

International bandy competitions
Bandy competitions in Europe
1954 in bandy
1954 in Moscow
International bandy competitions hosted by the Soviet Union
Sports competitions in Moscow